Paul McDonough may refer to:

 Paul McDonough (American football) (1916–1960), American football player
 Paul McDonough (photographer) (born 1941), American photographer